Rhipidomys itoan, also known as the sky climbing rat, is a species of rodent in the family Cricetidae.It is found in Brazil.

References

itoan
Mammals described in 2011
Mammals of Brazil